Jack Simmons, MBE (b. 28 March 1941) is a former cricketer who played for Lancashire and Tasmania.

Early life
Born 28 March 1941, Clayton-le-Moors, Lancashire, Simmons grew up there. He attended Accrington Technical School and then Blackburn Technical College, where he proved to be a gifted cricketer. However he did not show enough consistency at an early stage to attract the attention of County selectors. Instead following leaving school he became a journeyman professional cricketer in the lower Lancashire leagues. However his reputation and ability soon developed, and by his late 20s, Lancashire County Cricket Club had begun to scout him.

First-class career
Simmons was a lower-order right-hand batsman and a right-arm off break bowler who achieved almost iconic status for both the major teams that he played for. Solidly-built, he looked very little like an athlete, yet his close fielding was sharp and he remained fit into his late 40s.

A late arrival in county cricket at the age of 28, Simmons then enjoyed a 20-year career in which he was an integral part of the Lancashire side, though rarely hitting the headlines. His flat bowling trajectory and his accuracy meant that he could be economical in one-day cricket, and he was part of the highly successful Lancashire side under Jack Bond that won the Gillette Cup, the premier one-day competition in England, for three years in a row from 1970 to 1972. Simmons and slow left-arm bowler David Hughes were the first pair of spin bowlers to be used regularly and successfully in one-day cricket, which had previously been the preserve of seam bowling.

In first-class cricket, Simmons reliably contributed more than 500 runs and 50 wickets in most seasons in his career, and at the age of 47, he took 63 wickets in the 1988 season. The affection for "Flat Jack" in Lancashire was shown by his 1980 benefit, which raised £128,000. He was a Wisden Cricketer of the Year in 1985.

In 1972–73, he was invited to Tasmania to captain the local state side, whose first-class matches were restricted to games against touring sides. In six seasons as captain, Simmons led Tasmania into full first-class status and into the Sheffield Shield competition from 1977–78.

Later life
After half a dozen matches in the 1989 English season, Simmons retired. He has been County Chairman of Lancashire County Cricket Club since 1998 and was elected as the Chairman of Cricket for the England and Wales Cricket Board in January 2008.

See also
 List of Tasmanian representative cricketers

References

External links

CricketArchive
Cricinfo profile

1941 births
Living people
English cricketers
Lancashire cricketers
Tasmania cricketers
Wisden Cricketers of the Year
People from Clayton-le-Moors
Members of the Order of the British Empire